Kay Thi Thin is a Burmese physicist and a pro-rector of Mandalay University. She takes responsibility for the administration sector of the university. She previously served as a pro-rector of Meiktila University, and professor and head of physics departments of Lashio University and Myeik University.

Career
Kay Thi Thin conferred her PhD degree in the field of Nuclear Physics from the University of Yangon in 2002. She was appointed as a pro-rector of Mandalay University on 16 March 2020.

References

Living people
Academic staff of Mandalay University
Burmese academic administrators
Year of birth missing (living people)
University of Yangon alumni
Mandalay University alumni